Christopher Kirk (born 15 July 1947) is a New Zealand former cricketer. He played first-class cricket for Canterbury and Otago between 1969 and 1979.

See also
 List of Otago representative cricketers

References

External links
 

1947 births
Living people
New Zealand cricketers
Canterbury cricketers
Otago cricketers
Cricketers from Christchurch